Timothy Michael Sullivan (born July 2, 1964) is an American film director, producer, actor, and screenwriter.

Biography

Early career
A monster kid raised on Forrest J Ackerman's Famous Monsters of Filmland fanzine, Sullivan's career began as a teenager when he landed a job as a production assistant on the 1983 cult horror film Return of the Aliens: The Deadly Spawn. Sullivan majored in film studies at New York University, and his first writer/director/producer credit was the short A Christmas Treat (1985), for which he won Fangoria magazine's Short Film Search Award. While attending NYU, Sullivan wrote the music news for MTV. After graduating, he worked as a production assistant on such award-winning films as Three Men and a Baby, Cocktail, Coming To America, and The Godfather Part III.

Career 
Throughout his career Sullivan has worn many hats, including acting. Much like Alfred Hitchcock and Quentin Tarantino, he has cast himself for roles in his own films. He was production manager for the independent films If Looks Could Kill (1986) and America Exposed, (1990). After working in development at New Line Cinema for five years, Sullivan produced  Detroit Rock City which starred KISS, Edward Furlong, Sam Huntington and Natasha Lyonne.

Sullivan's mainstream directorial debut was the well-received Lion's Gate's horror-comedy, 2001 Maniacs (2005) starring Robert Englund and Lin Shaye. This was followed by Snoop Dogg's Hood of Horror (2005) (as co-writer and producer) and Driftwood (2006), a supernatural thriller about troubled youths at a reform camp, starring Raviv Ullman and Diamond Dallas Page.

Having released the long-awaited MANIACS sequel 2001 Maniacs: Field of Screams (2010), Sullivan gained additional notoriety as celebrity director of Vh1's hit series Scream Queens (2010), as well as creator and host of Shock N Roll, his weekly talk and video blog on leading web network Fearnet.

Re-joining forces with Detroit Rock City director Adam Rifkin for the comedy/horror anthology Chillerama (2011), Sullivan contributed the musical segment I Was a Teenage Werebear starring Sean Paul Lockhart, followed by the Rifkin written and directed  Burt Reynolds vehicle The Last Movie Star (2017), on which Sullivan earned an Associate Producer credit.

Deeply affected by the 2013 death of his 'spiritual mentor' Ray Manzarek (with whom he was adapting a film version of Manzarek's novel The Poet in Exile), Sullivan took an extended break from the industry (and Los Angeles) to focus on health, friends and family. It was during this time Sullivan formed his own production company, New Rebellion Entertainment., (with partners Diamond Dallas Page, Mike Markoff, Cooper Tomlinson and Nick Levay), creating and developing a variety of projects he will produce and direct in 2022, among them the late George A. Romero’s version of Masque of the Red Death (in partnership with Dark Horse Entertainment and written by Steve Niles), and the branded franchise Night Songs, which explores the paranormal romance between a music journalist and a vampiric young rock star featuring songs co-written by Sullivan with Doug Rockwell, Andreas Carlsson and Eric Singer of KISS.

Personal life
Sullivan is openly gay and a passionate activist for equality and NOH8.

Filmography

Actor
If Looks Could Kill (1986) as Groom (uncredited)
America Exposed as Biker
Detroit Rock City (1999) as KISS Concert Audience Member (uncredited)
2001 Maniacs (2005) as Coffin Harry
Driftwood (2006) as Van Driver (uncredited)
Famous Monster: Forrest J Ackerman (2007) as Himself
The War Prayer (2007) as The Preacher
Whore (2008) as Man in Black (uncredited)
2001 Maniacs: Field of Screams (2010) as Road Rascals Narrator (billed as Marc Ambrose)
Scream Queens (2010) as Himself
Chillerama (2011) as Coach Tuffman
Chillerama: House of Psycho Charger (2011) as Sgt. Sullivan
Bloody Bloody Bible Camp (2012) as Sister Mary Chopper
Lost Soul: The Doomed Journey of Richard Stanley’s Island of Dr. Moreau (2014) as Himself 
Adi Shankar's Gods and Secrets (2016) as Red
The Last Movie Star (2017) as Bouncer (uncredited)

Producer
 A Christmas Treat (1985)
 If Looks Could Kill (1986)
 America Exposed (1990)
 Detroit Rock City (1999) as associate producer
 Everclear: The Boys Are Back in Town Music Video (1999) as producer
 Snoop Dogg's Hood of Horror (2006)
 Killed on the Fourth of July (2010)
 Chillerama (2011) as executive producer
 Chillerama: House of Psycho Charger (PsychoCharger) Music Video (2011)
 One for the Road (2011) as executive producer
 Bloody Bloody Bible Camp (2012) as producer
 Cut/Print (2012) as producer
 The Last Movie Star (2017) as associate producer

Writer
 The Deadly Spawn (1983) Additional Dialogue
 A Christmas Treat (1985)
 2001 Maniacs (2005)
 Snoop Dogg's Hood of Horror (2006)
 Driftwood (2006)
 2001 Maniacs: Field of Screams (2010)
 Chillerama (segment I was a Teenage Werebear)(2011)

Director
 A Christmas Treat (1985)
 2001 Maniacs (2005)
 Driftwood (2006)
 2001 Maniacs: Field of Screams (2010)
 Chillerama (segment I was a Teenage Werebear)(2011)
 Chillerama: House of Psycho Charger (PsychoCharger) Music Video (2011)
 Mad World (Josh Brodis) 2012 Music Video (2012)
 Cut/Print LA Production'' (2012)

References

External links 

Tim Sullivan at Myspace

1964 births
American film producers
American male actors
American male screenwriters
Living people
Writers from Plainfield, New Jersey
Tisch School of the Arts alumni
LGBT film directors
LGBT people from New Jersey
Film directors from New Jersey